Edge of Excess is the tenth and final studio album by Canadian hard rock band Triumph, and the only one not to feature original guitarist and lead singer Rik Emmett who left the band in 1988, leaving Gil Moore as the sole lead vocalist. After a few years of inactivity, Moore and bassist Mike Levine recruited session guitarist Phil X to replace Emmett and released Edge of Excess in 1992. The song "Troublemaker" was featured in the 1992 movie Hellraiser III: Hell on Earth.

Track listing
 "Child of the City" – 5:03
 "Troublemaker" – 4:06
 "It's Over" – 4:21
 "Edge of Excess" – 4:44
 "Turn My Back on Love" – 4:06
 "Riding High Again" – 4:55
 "Black Sheep" – 5:25
 "Boy's Night Out" – 5:19
 "Somewhere Tonight" – 4:35
 "Love in a Minute" – 4:45

Personnel

Triumph
 Gil Moore – lead vocals, drums, percussion
 Michael Levine – bass, keyboards, synthesizers, vocals
 Phil "X" Xenedis – guitar, vocals

Additional Personnel
Mladen Alexander - Guitar
Lawrence Falcomer - Guitar

References

Triumph (band) albums
1992 albums
Albums produced by Mike Levine (musician)